Prabhu Jagadbandhu was a religious leader of Bengal. He spent much of his life meditating and preaching in the Sri Angan ashram in Faridpur, British India (present day Bangladesh). His teachings inspired the founding of a revival movement within Bengal Vaishnavism in the last decade of the 19th century and later the Mahanam Sampraday denomination. His devotees believe that he is Lord Sri Krishna and Chaitanya Mahaprabhu.

Life and teachings
Prabhu Jagatbandhu was born on 28 April 1871 in Dahapara, Murshidabad or Gobindapur, Faridpur, Bengal Presidency, British India to family of a Sanskrit scholar. His birthday on the auspicious day of Sita Navami is celebrated as Bandhu Navami. He was devout and would always sing the kirtans of Krishna and Chaitanya Mahaprabhu.
 
He stressed the importance of  God as means of remembering and drawing close to the divine. He urged the followers to follow the life of avoiding temptation.

His teachings were mainly based on-

1.Harinam

2.Brahmacarya

Once Prabhu Jagadbandu said

Prabhu Jagadbandu composed eight books on the worship of God through kirtan: Shrimatisangkirtan, Shrimansangkirtan, Bibidhasabgit (the first three were printed together under the title of Sangkirtan Padamrta), Shrisangkirtan, Padavali, Shrishriharikatha, Chandrapat, Trikal, and Uddharan.

See also
 Mahanambrata Brahmachari

References

External links
 
 Jagadbandhu in Bengali

Bengali Hindu saints
Devotees of Krishna
Founders of new religious movements
Gaudiya religious leaders
19th-century Hindu philosophers and theologians
Hindu mystics
Indian Hindu monks
Indian Hindu spiritual teachers
Indian Vaishnavites
Kirtan performers
People considered avatars by their followers
Vaishnava saints
Vaishnavite religious leaders
1871 births
1921 deaths
20th-century Hindu philosophers and theologians